Francis Edward Witts (1783–1854) was an English clergyman, diarist, and magistrate who was rector of Upper Slaughter in Gloucestershire.

Early life and family
Francis Witts was born in 1783.

Career
Witts was a clergyman, diarist, and magistrate. He was rector of Upper Slaughter in Gloucestershire.

Death and legacy
Witts died in 1854.

His grandson was the civil engineer and archaeologist George Backhouse Witts.

Selected publications
 The Diary of a Cotswold Parson

References

1783 births
1854 deaths
Clergy from Gloucestershire
English justices of the peace
English diarists